Team 3D was an American esports organization that formerly had teams competing in Counter-Strike: Source, Warcraft 3, Dead or Alive 4, Halo 2, Painkiller, and Call of Duty. Team 3D was one of the most successful North American Counter-Strike teams and briefly became a part of the Championship Gaming Series (CGS). The owner Craig "Torbull" Levine decided not to continue the team after the demise of the CGS in 2009.

History 
Team 3D was formed in 2002 by Craig "Torbull" Levine while a student at New York University in New York City, New York, United States. In 2004 it became one of the first professional eSports teams in the world when it began paying its players. Team3D won Counter-Strike at World Cyber Games 2004.

Tylenol was a sponsor for Team 3D for a period during 2005. In 2005 3D won the WCG US finals in both CS and Halo 2, qualifying for the World Cyber Games 2005 grand finals.

Team 3D was a founding member of the G7 teams. For parts of 2005 and 2006 3D sponsored Halo 2 Major League Gaming Pro Circuit team Shoot to Kill. In April 2006 3D dropped its sponsorship of its Halo 2 team, and the team became known as Final Boss. In 2007 3D became an inaugural member of the Championship Gaming Series and became known as NY.3D.

In the first season of the CGS, NY.3D came in 4th place out of 16 teams.

After the demise of the Championship Gaming Series, Levine reacquired team3d but the team soon dissolved. 3D stands for Desire — Discipline — Dedication. Levine went on to co-found the ESEA League. Sponsors of the team at various points in time included Intel and SteelSeries.

Former rosters

Notable achievements

References 

2002 establishments in New York (state)
2009 disestablishments in the United States
Esports teams based in the United States
Counter-Strike teams
Halo (franchise) teams